Kinsey is a 2004 American biographical drama film written and directed by Bill Condon. It describes the life of Alfred Charles Kinsey (played by Liam Neeson), a pioneer in the area of sexology. His 1948 publication, Sexual Behavior in the Human Male (the first of the Kinsey Reports) was one of the first recorded works that tried to scientifically address and investigate sexual behavior in humans. The film also stars Laura Linney (in a performance nominated for the Academy Award for Best Supporting Actress), Chris O'Donnell, Peter Sarsgaard, Timothy Hutton, John Lithgow, Tim Curry, and Oliver Platt.

Plot
Professor Alfred Kinsey is interviewed about his sexual history. Interspersed with the interview are flashbacks from his childhood and young-adulthood. The early years show his father, a lay minister of the Methodist church, denouncing modern inventions as leading to sexual sin, then in early adolescence, humiliating Kinsey in a store by denouncing its keeper for showing him cigarettes, while his adolescence shows his experiences as a Boy Scout and a late teenage scene shows Kinsey disappointing his father by his chosen vocational intentions. The adult Kinsey teaches at Indiana University as a professor of biology lecturing on gall wasps.

Kinsey falls in love with a student in his class, whom he calls Mac, and marries her. Consummation of their marriage is difficult at first, because of a medical problem Mac has that is fixed easily with minor surgery. At the university, Professor Kinsey, who is affectionately called "Prok" by his graduate students, meets with them after hours to offer individual sexual advice.

At a book party celebrating Kinsey's latest publication on gall wasps, Kinsey approaches the dean of students about an open-forum sex education course as opposed to the anti-sex propaganda taught in a general health education class. It is approved, but on the grounds that it is open only to teachers, graduate or senior students, and married students. Kinsey begins teaching the sex course to a packed auditorium.

Kinsey continues answering students' questions in personal meetings but his answers are severely limited by the paucity of scientific data about human sexual behavior. This leads Kinsey to pass out questionnaires in his sexual education class from which he learns of the enormous disparity between what society had assumed people do and what their actual practices are. After securing financial support from the Rockefeller Foundation, Kinsey and his research assistants, including his closest assistant, Clyde Martin, travel the country, interviewing subjects about their sexual histories.

As time progresses Kinsey realizes that sexuality within humans, including himself, is a lot more varied than was originally thought. The range of expression he creates becomes known as the Kinsey scale, which ranks overall sexuality from completely heterosexual to completely homosexual.

The first sexological book Kinsey publishes, which is on the sexual habits of the male, is a large-scale success and a best seller. Kinsey turns his research to women and is met with more controversy. With the release of the volume on female sexual behavior, support for his work declines in a time when Senator Joseph McCarthy's witch hunts against Communists and homosexuals (the latter known as the Lavender Scare) lead the Rockefeller Foundation to withdraw its financial support, fearing that it be labeled "Communist" for backing the subversion of traditional American values.

Kinsey feels he has failed everyone who has ever been a victim of sexual ignorance. A customs officer is tipped off to an importation of some of Kinsey's research material, which only exacerbates the financial hardship of Kinsey's research organization. Kinsey suffers a heart attack, and is found to have developed an addiction to barbiturates. Meeting with other philanthropists fails to garner the support needed. Still, Kinsey continues his taking of sex histories.

Returning to the initial interview, Kinsey is asked about love and whether he will ever conduct research on it. He responds that love is impossible to measure and impossible to quantify, but that it is important. Kinsey and Mac pull over to the side of the road for a nature walk. She remarks about a tree that has been there for a thousand years. Kinsey replies that the tree seems to display a strong love in the way its roots grip the earth. The two walk off together, Kinsey remarking "there's a lot of work to do".

Cast

Production
Producer Gail Mutrux handed Bill Condon a biography of Kinsey in 1999 to spark his interest in writing a screenplay. Condon then based his original screenplay on elements in the biography combined with his own original research on Kinsey.

Ian McKellen was at one point in negotiations for a supporting role.

Release
Kinsey was the first film permitted to show human genitalia uncensored in Japan, known for its strict censorship policies regarding genitalia.

Reception
The review aggregator website Rotten Tomatoes reported that 90% of critics have given the film a positive review based on 196 reviews, with an average rating of 7.66/10. The site's critics consensus reads, "A biopic of the sex researcher is hailed as adventurous, clever, and subversive, with fine performances by Liam Neeson and Laura Linney." On Metacritic, the film has a weighted average score of 79 out of 100 based on 40 critics, indicating "generally favorable reviews". Reviewing in the Chicago Sun-Times, Roger Ebert gave Kinsey four out of four stars and hailed it as a "fascinating bio" whose strength lies in "the clarity it brings to its title character ... a complete original, a person of intelligence and extremes", as well as how it "captures its times, and a political and moral climate of fear and repression". Ebert compared Neeson's performance to that of Russell Crowe in the 2001 biopic A Beautiful Mind.

The film grossed $10,254,979 domestically and $16,918,723 worldwide on an $11 million budget.

Top ten lists
Kinsey was listed on many critics' top ten lists for 2004.

 5th – Stephen Holden, The New York Times
 5th – Owen Gleiberman, Entertainment Weekly
 6th – Peter Travers, Rolling Stone
 7th – A.O. Scott, The New York Times
 7th – Jack Matthews, New York Daily News
 7th – Kevin Thomas, Los Angeles Times
 7th – Ruthie Stein, San Francisco Chronicle
 8th – Ty Burr, The Boston Globe'
 8th – Richard Schickel, Time 9th – Scott Foundas, L.A. Weekly 10th – David Ansen, Newsweek Top 10 (listed alphabetically) – Joe Morgenstern, The Wall Street Journal Top 10 (listed alphabetically) – Carina Chocano, Los Angeles Times Top 10 (listed alphabetically) – Ella Taylor, L.A. Weekly''

Awards and nominations

References

External links

 
 
 
 

2004 films
2004 biographical drama films
2004 LGBT-related films
American biographical drama films
American LGBT-related films
American Zoetrope films
Biographical films about educators
Biographical films about scientists
Bisexuality-related films
Male bisexuality in film
Cultural depictions of American men
2000s English-language films
Films directed by Bill Condon
Films scored by Carter Burwell
Films set in Indiana
Fox Searchlight Pictures films
2004 independent films
LGBT-related drama films
LGBT-related films based on actual events
Films with screenplays by Bill Condon
2004 drama films
Films set in universities and colleges
Biographical films about LGBT people
2000s American films
LGBT-related biographical films